Sylvia Weinstock (January 28, 1930 – November 22, 2021) was an American baker and cake decorator. She was known for making delicious, multi-tiered wedding cakes decorated with botanically accurate sugar flowers. She also created elaborate trompe-l'oeil cakes that looked like cars, a crate of wine, Fabergé eggs, and other objects.

Early life and education 
Sylvia Silver was born January 28, 1930, in the Bronx, New York. She was raised in Williamsburg, Brooklyn. The family lived above their shop, which sold liquor and later was a bakery.

Weinstock completed a bachelor's degree in 1951 in psychology at Hunter College. She later completed a master's degree in education from Queens College in 1973.

Career 
Weinstock's first career was as an elementary school teacher on Long Island. She began selling extra cakes to local restaurants, and then apprenticed with pastry chef George Keller at the suggestion of André Soltner of Lutèce. She started her cake baking and decoration company when she was 50 years old, after surviving breast cancer. Friend and bakery owner, William Greenberg, then began referring clients to her for wedding cakes, which he didn't make. The family moved from Long Island to Manhattan, and Weinstock baked cakes for private events, first at the Carlyle Hotel gaining clientele. She then began making wedding cakes. In 1983 she and her husband rebuilt a warehouse in Manhattan's Tribeca neighborhood into a four-story townhome and shop named Sylvia Weinstock Cakes.

Weinstock made decorative cakes for a variety of celebrities, including Oprah Winfrey, Kim Kardashian and Martha Stewart.  She avoided using fondant in her cake decorations, calling it "cheap and easy"; instead, she focused on buttercream, sugar flowers, and stenciled patterns. Weinstock was dubbed “the Leonardo da Vinci of wedding cakes" by Bon Appétit.

After retirement, Weinstock began appearing as a guest judge on the Food Network series Chopped Sweets and Top Chef: Just Desserts. She also appeared as a judge on the Netflix series Nailed It! and ¡Nailed it! México, for which she was described as the show's "secret weapon". She taught cake decorating at the Institute of Culinary Education.

Personal life 
In 1949, at age 19, she married Benjamin Weinstock (1925–2018). They settled on Long Island in Massapequa, New York. Weinstock raised three children.

References

1930 births
2021 deaths
American bakers
Jewish women in business
21st-century American Jews
People from Brooklyn
Chefs from New York City